Škoda 27Tr Solaris is a low-entry trolleybus model built from 2010 by Czech trolleybus manufacturer Škoda Electric (subsidiary of Škoda Transportation), supplying electrical equipment, in cooperation with Solaris, supplying body.

Trolleybuses
Low-entry buses